The 2009 Trinidad and Tobago Pro Bowl was the sixth season of the Digicel Pro Bowl, which is a knockout tournament competition for teams in the TT Pro League. The tournament took place at the conclusion of the 2009 season. Caledonia AIA entered as the tournament's defending champion. The tournament commenced on 17 November 2009 with 10 teams competing in single elimination matches and concluded with the final on 11 December.

Qualification
Every team based on the island of Trinidad took part in the tournament, with Tobago United as the lone Pro League representative that did not participate. Seeding for this year's competition was determined by each team's league position following the 2009 season. The bottom four teams in the table, United Petrotrin, FC South End, St. Ann's Rangers, and Police entered the tournament in the qualifying round.

The two winning teams from the qualifying round will take on the top two seeds Joe Public and Caledonia AIA, respectively. The other four clubs that qualified for the Pro League Big Six also entered the Pro Bowl directly in the quarterfinals.

Schedule
The schedule for the 2009 Digicel Pro Bowl, as announced by the TT Pro League:

†The winner will also receive an additional prize amount based on gate receipts from each match.

Bracket

Results
All matches were played for 90 minutes duration, at the end of which if the match was still tied, penalty-kicks were used to determine the match winner.

Qualifying round
On 17 November, St. Ann's Rangers pulled an upset over FC South End 1–0 with Josimar Belgrave providing the lone goal. In the other qualifying round match, Police also stunned United Petrotrin 2–1 to complete the teams in the quarterfinals.

Quarterfinals
In the quarterfinals on 20 November, Joe Public used four goals from 2009 Golden Boot winner, Kerry Baptiste, to a 9–1 win against Police. Ma Pau joined the Eastern Lions in the semifinals, with a win over W Connection at Manny Ramjohn Stadium. On the other side of the bracket, Caledonia AIA defeated St. Ann's Rangers by a score 5–0 following a hat-trick from Kendall Velox, while Defence Force provided the closest match in the round with their win over San Juan Jabloteh 2–1.

Semifinals
On 4 December, Joe Public and Caledonia AIA both registered 1–0 victories in the semifinals to advance to the final. The Eastern Lions used a Hayden Tinto goal in the thirteenth minute to upend Ma Pau. However, Caledonia AIA needed an 81st minute free kick from winger Kareem Joseph to defeat Defence Force.

Final
In the final, Joe Public came from behind to earn a draw 1–1 in regulation time before Colombian goalkeeper Alejandro Figueroa saved a Caledonia AIA's Keon Daniel penalty kick to give Joe Public a 5–3 win from the penalty spot.

References

External links
Official Website

2009 Digicel Pro Bowl
Pro Bowl